Swarup Singh (or Sarup Singh) (8 January 1815 – 17 November 1861) was the Maharana of Udaipur State (r. 1842–1861). He was the biological son of Maharaj Shivdan Singh of Bagore branch of the family, but was adopted by Maharana Sardar Singh. His reign spanned the Indian Rebellion of 1857 although he remained on the sidelines, as a party to the 1818 treaty with the British, signed by Maharaja Bhim Singh. He died in 1861 four years later after the Indian rebellion. He was succeeded by his nephew Shambhu Singh , son of his brother Sher Singh.

References

See also 

Monarchs of Marwar
Mewar dynasty
1815 births
1861 deaths